Olivier Sitruk (born December 25, 1970 in Nice, Alpes-Maritimes, France), is a French comedian, actor, and producer, who has appeared in 44 films and television shows.

After considering a career as an archaeologist, Sitruk changed his mind and discovered a passion for theater in high school.  At age 16, he began his acting career, enrolling in the Conservatoire National de Nice.

Sitruk made his English-language movie premiere in 2008, starring alongside Shirley MacLaine and Barbora Bobuľová in the Lifetime original biographical film, Coco Chanel.  The television movie debuted on September 13, 2008 with a viewership of 5.2 million, the second-highest rated made-for-TV film of 2008.  Sitruk played Boy Capel, a self-made man who was "the love of [Chanel's] life."

He is related to actor Jules Sitruk and former Chief Rabbi of France Joseph Sitruk. He has been married to actress Alexandra London since 2003.

Movies
 2016 : 
 Dieumerci !
 2008 :
 Coco Chanel with Shirley MacLaine, Barbora Bobuľová
 2007 :
 Fracassés (Fragments) with Matthieu Boujenah, Armelle Deutsch, Vincent Desagnat
 2005:
 Cavalcade as Steve Suissa, with Marion Cotillard, Titoff, Estelle Lefébure
 Avant qu'il ne soit trop tard with Frédéric Diefenthal, Édouard Montoute, Élodie Navarre, Émilie Dequenne, Arthur Jugnot
 2004 :
 Le Grand Rôle as Steve Suissa with Stéphane Freiss, Bérénice Bejo, Stéphan Guérin-Tillié
 Mariage Mixte with Olivia Bonamy, Gérard Darmon
 2002 :
 Irène as Luca with Cécile de France, directed by Ivan Calberác
 Guerreros as French Army Soldier Marceau, directed by Daniel Calparsoro
2001 :
 HS Hors Service
 Mémoire Morte
2000 :
 L’envol
 Passeurs de rêves
1997 : Quatre Garçons pleins d'avenir with Stéphan Guérin-Tillié, Thierry Lhermitte
 1995 : Un dimanche à Paris
 1994 : L'Appât as Bertrand Tavernier, a performance which earned him a Cesar award as Most Promising Actor. He co-starred with Bruno Putzulu and Marie Gillain, among others.
 1992 : Le nombril du monde
 1991 : La gamine

Television
2014
La France a un incroyable talent as judge in hury
 2007 :
  as Philippe Carrese
 L'Arche de Babel as Philippe Carrese
 Divine Emilie as Arnaud Sélignac
 Un Admirateur secret with Thierry Neuvic, Claire Keim
 Confidences sur canapé as Laurent Dussaux
 2006 :
 La volière aux enfants with Marilou Berry
 Les Camarades as François Luciani
 Jeff & Léo, Flics et jumeaux  - series – lead role (8 episodes) :

 Season 2 - 8 episodes :

 La beauté du diable
 Il faut sauver Alice
 Meurtre en blanc
 Grand froid
 Convoyeurs de fonds
 Une chute interminable
 Le placard
 Dernier tango

2005 : Quelques mots d'amour (La lettre)
 2004:
 Brasier
 Jeff & Léo, Flics et jumeaux  - series – lead role (6 episodes):

 Season 1 - 6 episodes :

 Un train peut en cacher un autre
 Entre deux étages
 Le mystère des bijoux
 Un mystère de trop
 La dernière séance
 Jardin Zen

 2003 : 3 Garçons, 1 fille, 2 mariages
 2002 :
 Lune Rousse
 Aurélien with Romane Bohringer, Clément Sibony
 L’année de mes 7 ans
 Traquée
 2001 :
 Génération Start Up
 Femmes de loi, episode « Une occasion en or »
 2000 : L’Algérie des chimères
 1998 : La Femme de l'Italien
 1997 : Les Moissons de l'Océan, with Dominique Guillo
 1996 :
 Profession Infirmière, episode « Sacha »
 Le Rouge et le Noir as Jean-Daniel Verhaeghe with Kim Rossi Stuart
 1995 :
 Les Allumettes Suédoises as Jacques Ertaud
 Entre ces mains-là
 La Veuve de l'architecte as Philippe Monnier

References

External links

Official site (French language)

1970 births
Living people
Male actors from Nice, France
Jewish French male actors
French male film actors
French male television actors
French National Academy of Dramatic Arts alumni